Benjamin Thomas (born 20 June 1989) is an Indian cricketer. He played seven List A matches for Hyderabad between 2010 and 2013. He made his first-class debut for Hyderabad in the 2016–17 Ranji Trophy on 27 October 2016.

See also
 List of Hyderabad cricketers

References

External links
 

1989 births
Living people
Indian cricketers
Hyderabad cricketers
Cricketers from Hyderabad, India